Morbid Curiosity may refer to:

Morbid curiosity, an interest in death or violence
Morbid Curiosity (magazine), San Francisco nonfiction magazine
Morbid Curiosity, 2007 novel by Deborah LeBlanc
"Morbid Curiosity", a Heathen song from the album Victims of Deception (1991)